Star Maa is an Indian Telugu language general entertainment private broadcast television network owned by the Disney Star, a subsidiary of an Indian multinational mass media corporation which is in turn owned by American mass media and entertainment conglomerate The Walt Disney Company. This is a list of the current and former programmes broadcast by the channel.

Currently broadcast

Drama series

Dubbed series

Reality shows

Spiritual shows

Former non-fiction shows 
 50-50 It's My Game Show - Hosted by Ohmkar
 70MM Movie Masters - It’s a movie based quiz show. The prize money is Rs. 18 Lacs. Hosted by Uttej
 100% Luck - Hosted by Ohmkar
 Aasha - It’s an AIDS awareness program
 Adrushtam - Hosted by Ohmkar
 Airtel Brain of Andhra - This is a gameshow, with 5 lacs of money at stake, every day, from Monday to Thursday, Participation is through lucky draw of participants answering correct answers to questions
 Airtel Lakshadhikari - This Is a housie show with a difference…..LIVE and exclusively meant for Airtel subscribers
 Ali Talkies - a film-based talk show hosted by ace comedian Ali; film celebrities come to Ali Talkies to chat up regarding their recent releases.
 Andamaina Jeevitam(1-2)- talk show- Jayasudha and Paruchuri Gopala Krishna are hosts
 Avakaya - Hosted by Suma Kanakala
 Atha Kodallu - Focusing on a very curious relation – the Mother-in-law and Daughter-in-law. Hosted by Vanisri as Mother in law and Surekhavaani as the Daughter in law
 Bethala Kathalu - Its an anchor based programme. Every week one newly released movie will be selected and the anchors who are disguised in Vikram and Bethal , will discuss about the movie and performance of the star cast, highlights of the movie.
 Bhale Chance Le (Season 1) - a traditional Snake and Ladders game hosted by Sreemukhi.
 Bhale Chance Le (Season 2) - a traditional Snake and Ladders game hosted by Suma Kanakala.
 Bigg Boss 1 - Hosted by Jr NTR.
 Bigg Boss 2 - Hosted by Nani.
 Bigg Boss 3 - Hosted by Nagarjuna and Ramya Krishnan (Guest Host in Week 6).
 Bigg Boss 4 - Hosted by Nagarjuna and Samantha Akkineni (Guest Host in Week 7).
 Bigg Boss 5  and 6 - Hosted by Nagarjuna 
 Cera Comedy Show - This is a comedy show , which aims to entertain through comedy.
 Challenge - A dance reality show hosted by Ohmkar
 Colors - An anchor based program, with lovely, vivacious, peppy, ebullient, irrepressible, exuberant, young teenage girl- "Swati" as the anchor,
 Comedy Stars (Season 1) - Hosted by Varshini Sounderajan
 Comedy Stars (Season 2) - Hosted by Sreemukhi
 Comedy Stars Dhamaka (Season 3) - Hosted by Deepika Pilli
 Connexion - Hosted by Suma Kanakala
 Dancee Plus - Hosted by Ohmkar with Monal Gajjar, Anne Master, Mumaith Khan, Raghu Master, Baba Bhaskhar, Yashwanth as judges ( It is the Telugu version of the show Dance Plus Hindi ).
 Dum Dum Diga Diga - This is a one hour DANCE BONANZA for aspiring dancers and dance lovers, juniors as well as seniors…. With Anchors - Uday Bhanu and Uttej (famous comedy hero) .. and with focus on film dance, in Andhra Pradesh
 Dupes Babio Dupes - The anchor introduces dupes of heroes and heroines and their imitable performance.
 Eureka Kasa Misa - A to be released film or a new film is chosen every week as the Subject, from which are generated clues for a crossword puzzle. These clues are shown in the above quiz program. The film’s name, along with the crossword format and the sponsor’s name is disseminated through a press Ad in leading Telugu dailies well in advance every week. The viewers watch the program on Sunday, get the clues and do the crossword. They call us up, if they have all the answers. We collate this information and announce the winners through scrolling on TV.
 F3 (2019) - Hosted by Suma Kanakala.
 Ishmart Jodi (Season 1 and 2) - Popular Telugu television celebrities and their real life partners battle out against each other in this fun game show hosted by Ohmkar.

 Lady boss -  Hosted by Suma Kanakala
 Love U Zindagi - A talk show which features a video conference call during the lockdown and hosted by Jhansi.
 Maa Mahalakshmi - A game show targeted at women, hosted by Anasuya Bharadwaj.
 Maa Punyakshetralu - This is a program about the holy temples in the state of A.P. The program gives a brief about the history of the temple, along with Interviews with the devotees.
 Maa Talkies - A comedy talk show hosted Raasi as Judge and hosted by Anchor, Venu and Dhanraj 
 Maa Voori Vanta - The longest running cookery show on Star Maa which brings various recipes from across the world closer to the audience.
 Mana Gramadevathalu - Goddesses in diff places have different legends and stories behind them…This program attempts to unravel the origins behind the legends of the different deities and gods and goddesses at different places all over India.
 Mana Punya Kshetralu
 Mast Jabardasth - This is a song based Program with 10 leading songs from the latest movies.
 Mathuga Gammathuga - This is an anchor based show. Anchor plays the clippings of the movies. The highlight of the programme is screening of original heroes (not celebrities) who do the adventures in real life
 Meelo Evaru Koteeswarudu (Seasons 1–3) - (Telugu version of Who Wants to be a Millionaire?) Hosted by Nagarjuna and (Season 4) - Hosted by Chiranjeevi.
 Modern Mahalakshmi - Women Game Show hosted by Roja
 Moguds Pellams - This is a game show involving the husband and wife.
 Neethone Dance - a dance show featuring real couples of Telugu television celebrities as a contestants hosted by Udaya Bhanu.
 Nee Kongu Bangaram Ganu - Hosted by Meena
 Nede Choodandi
 Padalavayondi - A music reality show hosted by S. P. Balasubrahmanyam
 Pandaga Chesuko - A comedy show hosted and performed by Ravi and Phani
 Pelli Choopulu - It's all about finding a perfect match for one of the most eligible bachelor of Telugu TV industry, Pradeep Machiraju and Suma Kanakala as a presenter.
 Pellipustakam - Celebrity couples talk about their married lives and their lives together.
 Rangam (Season 1 and 2) - A dance show featuring Telugu television celebrities in Season 1 and public contestants in Season 2 hosted by Udaya Bhanu.
 Rela Re Rela (Seasons 1–3) - a music talent show which brought out the hidden Telugu folk talent from across Andhra Pradesh and Telangana hosted by Udaya Bhanu.
 Reserve Gear Raju - Raju (Kama Somaraju) is a Truck driver , who along with his assistant (Guruswamy) anchors the show. The show is about songs , with a difference. Songs sent by the viewers are remixed sometimes sung in reverse- the reason for the programs name, or sung in another song style or in a style that is from a different time.
 Sanjeevini - This health program comes every week with a disease and its rectification. A specialist will discuss on the same.
 Saundarya Rekha - This is a private slot on beauty tips .
 Shakthi - Hosted by Anantha Lakshmi
 Songu Bhala - A first of its program focusing on ringtone downloads, our anchor announces different ringtones that one can download onto one’s mobile. a pull-code is given to each song , and if the viewer likes the song he /she can download it as a ring tone on His/Her mobile using the code and smsing it to 7337.
 Sreerastu Shubhamastu - The show everyday will be opened and closed by an anchor who will soon reckoned as a friend for the average woman, a person whose image will be designed to give the viewers a companion they never had. She will weave the series with her information, useful talks, current affairs, tips etc. Anchor – Surekha Vani; she is an anchor who has a loyal audience among the female population. Rounds include Beauty, Interior Design, Health, .Today’s Special and Sitara .
 Star Maa Paarivar league (Season 1–3) - A game with the serial teams of Star Maa Channel and Jhansi as well as hosted.
 Start Music (Season 1) - Hosted by Jhansi.
 Start Music Reloaded (Season 2) - Hosted by Sreemukhi.
 Start Music (Season 3 & 4) - Hosted by Suma Kanakala.
 Sixth Sense (Season 1–4) - Hosted by Omkar.
 Samsaram Oka Chadarangam(Seasons 1–8) - Hosted by Sumalatha
 Sell me the Answer - Hosted by Suma Kanakala
 Super Singer (Seasons 1–10) - A music talent show targeted at introducing new singers to the Tollywood music industry.
 Super Singer Junior - Hosted by Anasuya Bharadwaj and Sudheer with K. S. Chithra, Mano, Hemachandra and Ranina Reddy as judges.
 Swara Sagaram - A musical program, hosted by playback singer Sunitha, with a celebrity related to music - singer / lyricist / music director / musician every week
 Suprabhatam
 Top of the Tops - This program is upto showcasing the newly released movies and takes a critical look at them for analyzing them department wise. It helps one to choose the right movie for him to watch. Neetha, anchor, with her inimitable action livens up the show.
 The Great Telugu Laughter Challenge - A stand-up comedy show featuring Telugu popular comedian Brahmanandam as a Judge and Tejaswi Madivada as a presenter. The Telugu Version of the Hindi stand-up comedy series The Great Indian Laughter Challenge hosted by famous actor Akshay Kumar in STAR Plus (previously in STAR One)
 Tollywood Squares - (Telugu version of the show Hollywood Squares) Hosted by Navdeep.
 U R Under Rest - It’s a SMS based game show. Anchor will play a scene / clipping from a movie and ask a question like hero or heroine name , or hero dress etc. and give three options … a, b, c, and ask the viewers to send SMS as UR (space) Question No. & option to 7337.
 Wife Chethilo Life - a fun-filled game show featuring couples in which the wife faces the task, and her wrong move lands the husband in trouble. Hosted by Suma Kanakala.

Formerly broadcast serials
 Aame Katha (2019-2021)
 Agnisakshi (2017-2020)
 Ammamma.com (2007-2008)
 Ammaku Teliyani Koilamma (2021)
 Anna Chellalu (2011-2013)
 Arundathi (2010)
 Ashta Chamma (2013-2017)
 Athagaru Kotha Kodalu (2002)
 Bangaru Panjaram (2019-2021)
 Bharya (2018-2019)
 Chelleli Kapuram (2020-2022)
 Care of Anasuya (2020-2023)
 Chitti Talli (2020)
 Devatha - Anubandhala Alayam (2020-2022)
 Edureetha (2011-2012)
 Gorintaku (2019-2021)
 House of Hungama (2020)
 Jeevana Tarangalu (2008)
 Jyothi (2018-2019)
 Kanchanaganga (2012-2015)
 Kante Koothurne Kanali (2018-2019)
 Kanulu Moosina Neevaye (2019)
 Karthika Deepam (2017-2023)
 Kasthuri (2020-2022)
 Kathalo Rajakumari (2018-2020)
 Krishnaveni (2018-2020)
 Koilamma (2016-2020)
 Kongumudi (2016-2017)
 Kranthi (2010)
 Kushi (2013)
 Kutumba Gauravam (2017)
 Lakshmi Kalyanam (2016-2020)
 Laya (2008-2010)
 Love (2007-2008)
 Maa Pasalapudi Kathalu (2011)
 Mahalakshmi (2014)
 Malleswari (2016-2017)
 Manasuna Manasai (2018-2019)
 Manasichi Choodu (2019-2022)
 Manninchamma Nestama
 Missamma (2012-2014)
 Mounaraagam (2018-2021)
 Mr.Mallanna (2010)
 Naanaku Prematho (2017)
 Narada Leelalu (2007-2008)
 Neeli Kalavalu (2018)
 Neevalle Neevalle (2020-2021)
 Ok Jaanu (2017)
 Pavitra Bandham (2017-2018)
 Pelli Pandiri (2011)
 Puttinti Pattucheera (2013-2015)
 Radha Madhu (2006-2008)
 Raaja Rani (2016-2017)
 Rakhi Poornima (2022)
 Ramulamma (2014-2017)
 Rani Gaari Katha (2010-2011)
 Rudramadevi (2021)
 Sailu (2005)
 Sambarala Rambabu (2006-2007)
 Sasirekha Parinayam (2013-2016)
 Savirahe (2009)
 Savitramma Gari Abbayi (2019-2021) 
 Seethamaalakshmi (2014-2016)
 Seethakoka Chilaka (2015)
 Shambhavi (2018-2019)
 Shivaranjani (2010-2011)
 Shri Shrimathi Kalyanam (2009)
 Sindhuram (2010-2011)
 Siri Siri Muvvalu (2019-2020)
 Srimathi Srinivas (2021-2022)
 Sundarakanda (2017-2018)
 Thali Kattu Subhavela (2016)
 Thulasidhalam (2017)
 Uyyala Jampala (2017-2018)
 Vadinamma (2019-2022)
 Yevarigola Vaaride (2003)
 Yuva (2007-2008)

 Dubbed serials 
 Abhinandana (2012-2013) 
 Alajadi (2011)
 Attarillu (2010-2012)
 Avekallu (2018-2019)
 Chandrakantha (2017)
 Chigurakulalo Chilakamma (2012-2014)
 Chinnari Pellikuthuru (2009-2017)
 Choopulu Kalisina Subhavela (2012-2013)
 CID (2011-2021)
 Daiva Shree Ganpati (2020)
 Durga (2017)
 Eetaram Illalu (2013-2017)
 Ganesh Vasanth (2011)
 Geetha Govindam (2018-2019)
 Hara Hara Mahadeva (2012-2015)
 Janaki Ramudu (2016-2017)
 Jin Mayajalam (2020-2021)
 Kaala Bhairava Rahasyam (2018)
 Kodalu Diddina Kapuram (2016-2017)
 Kodala Kodala Koduku Pellama (2012-2018)
 Kundanapu Bomma (2017)
 Maa Inti Mahalakshmi (2016-2017)
 Mahabharatham (2013-2015)
 Mahalo Kokila (2020-2021)
 Manasupalike Mounageetham (2015-2016)
 Manasu Mata Vinadhu (2020-2021)
 Maro Chanakyudu (2007-2008)
 Naadhi Aadajanme (2011-2013)
 Om Namah Shivaya (2017)
 Pavitra (2011-2014)
 Premayuddham (2016)
 Pellante Noorella Panta (2012-2016)
 Puttaadi Bomma (2007-2008)
 RadhaKrishna (2019, 2021)
 Ramayanam (2007-2008, 2020)
 Rukhmini (2007-2009)
 Seethakoka Chiluka (2011)
 Shree Krishna (2020-2021)
 Sri Shanidevuni Mahimalu (2011)
 Sri Subrahmanya Charitham (2018)
 Swamiye Saranam Ayyappa (2007-2008)
 Vasantha Kokila (2010-2012)
 Ye Maaya Chesave'' (2016-2017)

Acquired serials

References 

Star Maa
Disney Star